Eugenio Lamanna (born 7 August 1989) is an Italian professional footballer who plays as a goalkeeper for  club Monza.

Career

Gubbio
In the 2010–11 season Lamanna suffered an injury that ruled him out for an entire month.

Bari (loan)
In summer 2011 Lamanna was signed by A.S. Bari in a temporary deal.

Siena
In summer 2012 Lamanna joined Siena for €1.5 million as part of the deal that brought Mattia Destro to Roma via Genoa from Siena. On 22 August 2012, he was sent to Bari on loan.

In July 2013 Lamanna returned to Siena for 2013–14 pre-season camp. Lamanna was expected to replace Gianluca Pegolo who was heavily linked to other clubs, a transfer completed afterwards. Lamanna was awarded no.1 shirt, previously owned by Željko Brkić in 2011–12 season.

Return to Genoa
On 20 June 2014, the co-ownership between Siena and Genoa were renewed. However, on 15 July 2014, Siena announced that they failed to acquire the license for 2014–15 Serie B, thus the club would be liquidated. On 25 July 2014, Lamanna returned to Genoa. On 5 October 2015, he signed a new contract which would last until 30 June 2019.

Spezia
On 12 July 2018, Lamanna signed with Spezia on a permanent basis.

Monza
On 13 July 2019, he signed a 3-year contract with Monza in Serie C.

Career statistics

Honours
Monza
 Serie C Group A: 2019–20

References

External links

 Profile at A.C. Monza
 

1989 births
Living people
Sportspeople from Como
Footballers from Lombardy
Italian footballers
Association football goalkeepers
Como 1907 players
Genoa C.F.C. players
A.S. Gubbio 1910 players
S.S.C. Bari players
A.C.N. Siena 1904 players
Spezia Calcio players
A.C. Monza players
Serie D players
Serie C players
Serie B players
Serie A players